Gameknight999 is a series of novels written by Mark Cheverton, a southern California-based author, and published from 2013 to 2017. The story is set in the world of the Minecraft sandbox video game. The second novel of the series was listed in the Publishers Weekly bestseller list in November 2014 and the New York Times children's series bestseller list in February 2015.

Plot 
The series describes adventures of the protagonist with the user name "Gameknight999", who finds himself teleported by one of his father's inventions into the world of the Minecraft video game. Gameknight discovers that the creatures in the game are alive and it isn't a game to them. Gameknight experiences real-life adventures and actual danger with life-or-death consequences while stuck in the Minecraft digital universe.

Most of the novels feature Herobrine as the main antagonist, who is an urban legend and creepypasta that originated as a hoax propagated by an anonymous post on the English-language imageboard website 4chan.

From 2014 to 2017, a total of six trilogies featuring Gameknight999 were published.
 Minecraft series #1 – Gameknight999
 Invasion of the Overworld
 Battle for the Nether (Publishers Weekly bestseller)
 Confronting the Dragon
 Minecraft Series #2 – Mystery of Herobrine
 Trouble in Zombie-Town
 The Jungle Temple Oracle
 Last Stand on the Ocean Shore
 Minecraft Series #3 – Herobrine Reborn
 Saving Crafter
 Destruction of the Overworld
 Gameknight999 vs Herobrine
 Minecraft Series #4 – Herobrine’s Revenge
 Phantom Virus
 Overworld in Flames
 System Overload
 Minecraft Series #5 – Birth of Herobrine
 The Great Zombie Invasion
 Attack of the Shadow-Crafters
 Herobrine's War
 Minecraft Series #6 – Mystery of Entity303
 Terrors of the Forest
 Monsters in the Mist
 Mission to the Moon

Background 
Cheverton says he originally wrote the first book of the Gameknight999 series, Invasion of the Overworld, to teach his son about cyberbullying.

Publication history 
Along with Cheverton's other books, the GameKnight999 series is published by Skyhorse Publishing under the Sky Pony Press imprint, and distributed by Simon & Schuster. The publisher distributes all of Cheverton's novels as well as four box sets.

Reception 
This Gameknight999 series (in particular the second novel Battle for the Nether) was listed in the Publishers Weekly bestseller list in November 2014. Battle for the Nether was listed for one week in the New York Times children's series bestseller list in February 2015. According to Cheverton's website, the series has been published in 32 countries and translated into 22 languages.

In reviewing the first novel, online magazine Brutal Gamer wrote that "the story stays pretty true to the Minecraft experience. ... Whether you’re trying to pry your Minecraft addict away from the screen for a little while, or just looking for an interesting new choice for summer reading time, Invasion of the Overworld is sure to be a hit with the 8-11 year old set."

A review in The Guardian said of Battle of the Nether, "If you play Minecraft then you will love this and if you don't play it, then this is a great way to get you started on the fun!"

References 

Book series introduced in 2014
Series of children's books
Fan fiction works
Characters in children's literature
Minecraft in popular culture
Books about video games